Julie Jenkins (born August 12, 1964) is an American middle-distance runner. She competed in the women's 800 metres at the 1992 Summer Olympics.

Competition record

References

External links
 

1964 births
Living people
Athletes (track and field) at the 1992 Summer Olympics
American female middle-distance runners
Olympic track and field athletes of the United States
Place of birth missing (living people)
Competitors at the 1990 Goodwill Games
20th-century American women